Noah Brooks (October 24, 1830 – August 16, 1903) was an American journalist and editor who worked for newspapers in Sacramento, San Francisco, Newark, and New York. He is known for authoring a major biography of Abraham Lincoln based on close personal observation.

Career
Born in Castine, Maine, he moved to Dixon, Illinois in 1856, where he became involved in John C. Frémont's campaign for president. During the campaign, he became friends with Abraham Lincoln. Brooks moved to Kansas in 1857 as a "free state" settler, but returned to Illinois about a year later, then moved to California in 1859. After the death of his wife in 1862, Brooks moved to Washington, D.C. to cover the Lincoln administration for the Sacramento Daily Union. He was accepted into the Lincoln household as an old friend. Unlike most people, Brooks was able to maintain a close friendship with both the President and Mrs. Lincoln. When Brooks was detailed to cover the 1864 Democratic Convention in Chicago, President Lincoln asked Brooks to also report back in detail by private letter.

In 1884, Brooks wrote the first novel exclusively about baseball: Our Base Ball Club and How It Won the Championship (New York: E. P. Dutton, 1884).

Brooks' 258 Washington dispatches for the Sacramento Daily Union were published under the name "Castine." In 1895, Brooks published his biography of Lincoln, Washington in Lincoln's Time, based on his Castine articles, as well as personal observations and interviews. The book is now considered an indispensable source of information on the Lincoln White House.

In 1901, Brooks published The Story of the Lewis and Clark Expedition based largely on the Nicholas Biddle history of the Expedition. Brooks was assisted by the notes written in the margins of his manuscript by Dr. Elliott Coues, who had edited the 1894 edition of Biddle, and who had wide experience as an explorer of the American West.

In the 2017 documentary film The Gettysburg Address, Brooks is portrayed by actor Jason Alexander.

Notes

Further reading
 Temple, Wayne Calhoun, et al. eds. Lincoln's Confidant: The Life of Noah Brooks (2019). Online book review
 Neely Jr., Mark E. The Abraham Lincoln Encyclopedia, New York, NY, 1982.
"Introduction," The Story of the Lewis and Clark Expedition Mineloa, NY, 2004.
Noah Brooks -- Wilson Museum Bulletin
The National Cyclopedia of American Biography
Wayne C. Temple and Justin G. Turner, "Lincoln's 'Castine:' Noah Brooks", Lincoln Herald vol. 73 (chapters in various numbers)

External links
 
 
 Washington in Lincoln's Time from the Internet Archives' American Libraries.
 Mr. Lincoln's White House on Noah Brooks An article backed by the Lehrman Institute.

1830 births
1903 deaths
American newspaper editors
American biographers
American male biographers
People from Castine, Maine
People from Dixon, Illinois
Historians from Illinois